Lesmahagow (or Lesmahagae) is a small town in the historic county of Lanarkshire on the edge of moorland, near Lanark in the central belt of Scotland. Lesmahagow was also a civil parish. It lies west of the M74, and southeast of Kirkmuirhill. It is also known as Abbey Green or the Gow.

Etymology

The name means "Enclosure (meaning a walled area, like a monastery or fort) of St Machutus". The saint was born in Wales and may originally have been known as "Mahagw" prior to emigrating to Brittany where he became known by the Latinised form of the name and also as "St Malo". It is also possible that the first syllable may mean "garden" rather than "monastery", although Mac an Tailleir (2003) believes the former was altered from the latter in Gaelic.

Religion

The town has three Christian congregations, namely Lesmahagow Old Parish Church of the Church of Scotland and Abbeygreen Church of the Free Church of Scotland and an Evangelical congregation, (the Hope Hall) on the main street.

Lesmahagow Priory, founded by Benedictine monks in 1144, no longer stands but its foundations were excavated in 1978 and are located next to the Old Parish Church off Church Square.

The Scottish branch of the International Society for Krishna Consciousness operates from Lesmahagow.

Twin towns

Clydesdale International Twinning Association (CITA) was set up in 1975 to promote the benefits of twinning to all sections of the local community. This organisation mainly focuses on the larger towns in the old Clydesdale council area.

Highland Games

The Highland Games are held annually in June with Pipe Bands competing in Grades 1 through 4. There are also events for Highland dancing, weight over the bar, tossing the caber and archery. The first Highland Games was held in 1960 as a result of a collaboration between Lesmahagow Juniors Football Club and the now defunct Vale of Nethan Pipe Band. Originally held in Craighead Park, it is now held in the Glebe Park and entry is free, mainly due to community fundraising events and a strong committee.

Development Trust

Lesmahagow Development Trust (LDT) was formed on 28 August 2009. It is an independent, not-for-profit company registered as a charity in Scotland and the UK. The Trust funds and implements projects to enhance the facilities and environment of the village.

Notable residents 

Rev Thomas Burns, founder of the Thomas Burns Blind School in Edinburgh, born there.
 Alexander Cairncross Sir Alexander Kirkland "Alec" Cairncross KCMG FBA FRSE, born in Lesmahagow in 1911. Leading British economist. Professor of Applied Economics at the University of Glasgow, Economic Adviser to HM Government, Head of Government Economic Service, Master of St Peter's College, Oxford, Chancellor of the University of Glasgow.
 John Cairncross born in Lesmahagow in 1913 and brother of Alexander Cairncross. Civil servant, intelligence officer and spy in World War II. In 1951, he admitted spying for the Soviet Union. The "fifth man" in the Cambridge Five (along with Guy Burgess, Donald Maclean, Kim Philby and Anthony Blunt). His autobiography, The Enigma Spy, was published in 1997.
 Edward Glover (1888–1972), physician and psychoanalyst, born there.
John Greenshields (1795–1835) a short-lived but talented Scottish sculptor responsible for works such as Sir Walter Scott in Parliament House, Edinburgh
 Jim Holton (1951–1993), Scottish football centre-half, was born there. He died, aged 42, after suffering a heart attack at the wheel of his car.
Rev. Dr Thomas Martin Lindsay DD FRSE (1843–1914), theologian
 Jackie Lockhart née Steele (1965–), World ladies curling champion skip, and later BBC sports commentator 
 Alexander Muir, composer of Canadian patriotic song "The Maple Leaf Forever", was born in Lesmahagow in 1830 before emigrating to Canada as a child.

References

 
Towns in South Lanarkshire
Civil parishes of Scotland